Robert Henry Burns (born January 12, 1952) is a former American football running back for the New York Jets. He played his college football at Georgia. He is the father of MLB player Billy Burns. 

Burns played only the 1974 season for the Jets. His best game came against the New York Giants, which was played at the Yale Bowl in New Haven, Connecticut. Filling in for the injured FB John Riggins, Burns gained with 101 yards on 21 attempts in the 26–20 Jets win.

References 

1952 births
Living people
George D. Chamberlain High School alumni
American football running backs
Georgia Bulldogs football players
New York Jets players
Players of American football from Tampa, Florida